Giacomo Nava (born 27 January 1997) is an Italian professional footballer who plays as a goalkeeper for Maltese club Birkirkara.

Club career

Llapi
On 7 January 2020, Nava signed a one-and-a-half-year contract with Football Superleague of Kosovo club Llapi to replace the departed Bledar Hajdini as the first choice. On 16 February 2020, he made his debut in a 0–0 away draw against Dukagjini after being named in the starting line-up.

International career
On 20 April 2012, Nava was named as part of the Italy U15 squad for 2012 Torneo delle Nazioni to replace the injured Andrea Zaccagno. On 28 April 2012, he made his debut with Italy U15 in a 2012 Torneo delle Nazioni match against Croatia U16 after being named in the starting line-up.

References

External links

1997 births
Living people
People from Lavagna
Italian footballers
Italy youth international footballers
Italian expatriate footballers
Association football goalkeepers
Serie A players
U.C. Sampdoria players
Serie D players
Calcio Lecco 1912 players
Serie C players
Rimini F.C. 1912 players
Football Superleague of Kosovo players
KF Llapi players
Sportspeople from the Province of Genoa
Footballers from Liguria
20th-century Italian people
21st-century Italian people
Birkirkara F.C. players
Expatriate footballers in Malta
Italian expatriate sportspeople in Malta
Maltese Premier League players